Dylan Valley is a South African filmmaker, born and raised in Cape Town. He has directed work with SABC, Al Jazeera, and independently. He teaches in the television studies department at Wits University.

Early years and Education 
Valley grew up in Kuils River and then the white suburb of Durbanville where he faced being the only coloured child in the neighborhood. From this experience, he was pushed into the hip-hop music that constructed his identity. The Hip-Hop music genre led valley to incorporate this style within his another passion that is documentary filmmaking. And now, we can see his work which is a mix of music, art, performance, that tell stories about real people.

After graduating from Fairmont High School , Durbanville, he started to study Film and Media at the University of Cape Town and during this time, he did an internship at E-TV for 2 months. In 2005, as his final university project, he made a 10 minutes documentary about the history of the Cape Capoeira (Brazilian martial arts) scene. In 2006, he got his Honors degree in Film Theory and Practice from UCT and also produced a film, as his final thesis, called Lost Prophets with his co-producer and collaborator Sean Drummond, talking about Prophets of the city which shows the history of personal stories of South Africa's Hip Hop. The documentary was screened at various film festivals in South Africa.

Career 
In 2007 he worked at Plexus Films on the HEADWRAP team as a researcher and trainee director. And he got promoted to director straight away. Later, he was invited to direct some of the famous episodes from the series Headwrap including “Hip Hopera” and “Awareness thru Colours”. With Plexus Films, Valley developed a feature-length documentary, called Afrikaaps which explores the history of Afrikaans using Hip Hop, humour and personal perspective. The film, follows a group of local artists, creating the stage production, Afrikaaps, as they trace the true roots of Afrikaans to slaves in the cape. The documentary won Best South African Documentary at the Cape Winelands Film Festival. Valley was also nominated for Best documentary director at the 2012 South African Film and Television Awards for his work on Afrikaaps. In 2009, he was selected in The Mail and Guardian's list of 300 Young South Africans you have to take to lunch.

He has also directed two documentaries for Al Jazeera's Arabic documentary channel, on struggle icons Fatima Meer and Tatamkhulu Afrika.

Valley's last film was about a gang member who becomes a gospel rapper. The movie called “Incarcerated Knowledge” follows Peter John Christians' release from prison for murder, and tracks his progress on his way to become a hip hop artist.

References

External links
http://www.dylanvalley.com/

Year of birth missing (living people)
Living people
South African film producers
South African guitarists
Male guitarists
People from Cape Town
University of Cape Town alumni